Highway 796 is a provincial highway in the Canadian province of Saskatchewan. It runs from Highway 26 near Spruce Lake to Highway 795 near Aspen Cove on Turtle Lake. Highway 796 is about 26 km (16 mi.) long.

Highway 796 connects with an access road to Crystal-Bay Sunset on Brightsand Lake.

References

796